Sanctacaris is a Middle Cambrian arthropod from the Burgess Shale of British Columbia. It was most famously regarded as a stem-group chelicerate, a group which includes horseshoe crabs, spiders and scorpions, although subsequent phylogenetic studies have not always supported this conclusion. Its chelicerate affinities regain support in later observations, alongside the reassignment of Habelia optata as a sanctacaridid-related basal chelicerate. It has been placed as a member of the extinct family Sanctacarididae alongside Wisangocaris and Utahcaris.

Sanctacaris specimens range from 46 to 93 mm in length. The head bears five pairs of grasping appendages (corresponding to chelicerate's pedipalps and walking legs) and a sixth pair of posterior appendages (correspond to horseshoe crab's chilaria). The grasping appendages each bear an antenna-like exopods. There are 11 body segments, with the former 10 each bearing a pair of biramus appendage with flap-like exopod and reduced leg-like endopod. There is a broad, flat paddle-like telson.

Originally Sanctacaris was called informally 'Santa Claws'. Its Latin name translates as "saintly crab". Unlike most other Burgess forms, Sanctacaris is not present in Charles Walcott's 1909 quarry and was discovered at a different level by Desmond Collins in 1980–1981.

Etymology 
The generic name "Sanctacaris " is a compound of the Latin words "sanctus" (saint or sacred) and "caris" (meaning crab or shrimp, a common suffix used in aquatic arthropods). The specific name of the type species "uncata " means "claws" in Latin and is named after the claw-shaped appendages on the head of this species. The name "saint claws" refers to Santa Claus, which was the field name used to refer to Sanctacaris.

Ecology 
The robust gnathobases, alongside the fact that fellow sanctacaridid Wisangocaris has been found with trilobite fragments in its stomach, has led to suggestions that Sanctacaris was durophagous, feeding on hard shelled organisms.

References

External links 
 

Prehistoric chelicerates
Burgess Shale fossils
Fossil taxa described in 1988
Cambrian genus extinctions